Tawny Little (née Godin; born September 15, 1956), Miss America 1976 and Miss New York 1975, is an American television personality.

Early life and education
Godin was born in Portland, Maine. She was raised in Yonkers, New York and Toronto, Ontario, Canada. She became involved with the Miss New York pageant to raise tuition for Skidmore College but dropped out after she became Miss America. She later studied at the University of Southern California.

Career
Little was a reporter and anchor with three Los Angeles television stations beginning in 1977 with KABC-TV.  At KABC-TV, she served as a reporter, Eyewitness News anchor and co-host with a number of shows such as AM Los Angeles, Eye on LA, Hollywood Close-up and The Love Report. After leaving KABC in 1992, Little joined KCAL-TV as a news anchor for Prime 9 News. Later, from 1995 to 1999, she became a co-anchor with KCOP-TV's UPN News 13. Little also appeared in a few films and television shows including Rocky II, T.J. Hooker, Hart to Hart and Benson.

Personal life

She was a contestant on The $128,000 Question starring Mike Darow back in 1977 on the subject Shakespeare.  On her final win, she won $8,000.

She changed her name to Little after marrying her first husband Miles Little, a neurosurgeon in Los Angeles (1977–1981). After her divorce from Little, she married The Dukes of Hazzard star John Schneider (1983–1986). This marriage also ended in divorce.

In 1986, Little married Don Corsini, general manager of KCBS-TV and KCAL-TV, with whom she had two sons, Joseph John, "J.J.", (born 1987) and Chris (born 1989). She and Corsini divorced in 1999. She then married Los Angeles-based lawyer Rick Welch, with whom she had one son, Cole. They remained married until Welch's death in October 2014.

References

External links
 

1956 births
Living people
Television anchors from Los Angeles
Miss America 1976 delegates
Miss America winners
Miss New York winners
People from Portland, Maine
American women television journalists
21st-century American women